Narodna misao (Serbian Cyrillic: Народна мисао, English: "People's Thought") was a Montenegrin short-lived weekly political newspaper, founded and published in town of Nikšić, by members of People's Party, used to the official gazette of the party that advocated the unification of Montenegro and Serbia and overthrow the Petrovic-Njegos dynasty.

Newspaper began its publication on 3 September 1906. One of the founders and owners of the "Narodna misao" was politicians Andrija Radović and Marko Radulović, both formerly Prime Ministers of Montenegro. The newspaper was abolished in November 1907, with the intervention of the new Royalist True People's Party-led government.

References

Newspapers established in 1906
Mass media in Nikšić
1906 establishments in Montenegro